The 2019 1. deild karla (English: Men's First Division) was the 65th season of second-tier Icelandic football. Twelve teams contested the league. The season began on 4 May and concluded on 21 September.

Teams
The league was contested by twelve clubs. Eight remained in the division from the 2018 season, while four new clubs joined the 1. deild karla:
 Fjölnir and Keflavík were relegated from the 2018 Úrvalsdeild, replacing ÍA and HK who were promoted to the 2019 Úrvalsdeild.
 Afturelding and Grótta were promoted from the 2018 2. deild karla, in place of ÍR and Selfoss who were relegated to the 2019 2. deild karla.

Club information

League table

Top goalscorers

References

External links
 Fixtures at ksí.is

1. deild karla (football) seasons
Iceland
Iceland
2